Ishikawa diagrams (also called fishbone diagrams, herringbone diagrams, cause-and-effect diagrams) are causal diagrams created by Kaoru Ishikawa that show the potential causes of a specific event.

Common uses of the Ishikawa diagram are product design and quality defect prevention to identify potential factors causing an overall effect. Each cause or reason for imperfection is a source of variation. Causes are usually grouped into major categories to identify and classify these sources of variation.

Overview

The defect is shown as the fish's head, facing to the right, with the causes extending to the left as fishbones; the ribs branch off the backbone for major causes, with sub-branches for root-causes, to as many levels as required.

Ishikawa diagrams were popularized in the 1960s by Kaoru Ishikawa, who pioneered quality management processes in the Kawasaki shipyards, and in the process became one of the founding fathers of modern management.

The basic concept was first used in the 1920s, and is considered one of the seven basic tools of quality control. It is known as a fishbone diagram because of its shape, similar to the side view of a fish skeleton.

Mazda Motors famously used an Ishikawa diagram in the development of the Miata (MX5) sports car.

Root causes

Root-cause analysis is intended to reveal key relationships among  various variables, and the possible causes provide additional insight into process behavior.

The causes emerge by analysis, often through brainstorming sessions, and are grouped into categories on the main branches off the fishbone. To help structure the approach, the categories are often selected from one of the common models shown below, but may emerge as something unique to the application in a specific case.

Each potential cause is traced back to find the root cause, often using the 5 Whys technique.

Typical categories include:

The 5 Ms (used in manufacturing)
Originating with lean manufacturing and the Toyota Production System, the 5 Ms is one of the most common frameworks for root-cause analysis:
Manpower / mind power (physical or knowledge work, includes: kaizens, suggestions)
Machine (equipment, technology)
Material (includes raw material, consumables, and information)
Method (process)
Measurement / medium (inspection, environment)
These have been expanded by some to include an additional three, and are referred to as the 8 Ms:
Mission / mother nature (purpose, environment)
Management / money power (leadership)
Maintenance

The 8 Ps (used in product marketing)
This common model for identifying crucial attributes for planning in product marketing is often also used in root-cause analysis as categories for the Ishikawa diagram:
Product (or service)
Price
Place
Promotion
People (personnel)
Process
Physical evidence (proof)
Performance

The 4 or 5 Ss (used in service industries)
An alternative used for service industries, uses four categories of possible cause: 
Surroundings
Suppliers
Systems
Skill
Often an important 5th S is added - Safety

See also 

Seven Basic Tools of Quality
Five whys
Issue map
Issue tree
Resource management

References

Further reading 

 Ishikawa, Kaoru (1990); (Translator: J. H. Loftus); Introduction to Quality Control; 448 p;  
 Dale, Barrie G. et al. (2007); Managing Quality 5th ed;  

Causal diagrams
Causality
Knowledge representation
Quality control tools
Japanese inventions